Florida Polytechnic University (Florida Poly) is a public university in Lakeland, Florida. Created as an independent university in 2012, it is the newest of the 12 institutions in the State University System of Florida. It is the state's only public polytechnic university, and focuses solely on STEM education.

The institution originated as a branch campus of the University of South Florida, which opened in 1988. The State of Florida authorized a new campus in 2008, and renamed the school University of South Florida Polytechnic. In 2012, the Florida Legislature initiated plans to dissolve the USF branch campus and reform the Lakeland institution into an independent school. Florida Poly opened for classes on August 25, 2014 with an inaugural class of 554 students.

Florida Poly resides on a 170-acre campus. The university's Innovation, Science and Technology (IST) Building, designed by architect Santiago Calatrava, is home to a 3-D printing lab, cyber gaming and media lab, cyber security lab, robotics lab, and a big data lab. In addition, Florida Poly is the first university whose campus library is completely digital.

History

The University of South Florida opened a satellite campus in Lakeland – University of South Florida Lakeland – in 1988. The branch shared its grounds with the Lakeland campus of Polk Community College (now Polk State College). By the 2000s it had grown to enroll around 4,000 students, and the local business owners secured state funding for a separate campus in 2008. The same year, USF's trustees renamed the campus University of South Florida Polytechnic, reflecting a new focus on STEM education. A site near Interstate 4 was chosen for the new campus. In 2009 Spanish architect Santiago Calatrava was selected to design the campus' first building.

Meanwhile, the institution's backers, most prominently Florida State Senator J. D. Alexander, initiated a campaign to break USF Polytechnic away from USF and form an independent university, Florida Polytechnic University. In 2011 Alexander proposed a 2012-13 state budget that provided $33 million for the move. Like the acquisition of the new campus, the proposed split was controversial in some quarters, as it came during a tight budget year and was unpopular with USF students and faculty. In response to Alexander's proposal, the Florida Board of Governors approved a multi-year plan to allow Florida Polytechnic to gain independence gradually once it met certain criteria, including accreditation, the construction of residence halls, and the development of a STEM curriculum. Displeased with the board's compromise, Alexander introduced a new budget for the state universities that included immediate independence from USF Polytechnic, effectively bypassing the Board of Governors.

On April 20, 2012, Governor Rick Scott signed into law Alexander's budget for the State University System, including the provision that created Florida Polytechnic University as an independent institution, and closed down USF Polytechnic. The law took effect on July 1, 2012. In a letter that accompanied the signed legislation (SB 1994) creating Florida Poly, Scott noted that Florida Poly, with its strong focus on STEM programs, will be a key component of the State University System of Florida meeting the goals outlined in its 2012-2015 Strategic Plan. The strategic plan requires the State University System to increase STEM degree production from 9,605 to 22,500 per year by 2025.

The university submitted its initial application for regional accreditation in December 2014. In March 2016, the Florida Poly administration announced that the university would not meet its original accreditation deadline of December 31, 2016. A budget bill sent to the office of Gov. Rick Scott would extend the school's accreditation deadline until December 2017. The university finally received accreditation from the Southern Association of Colleges and Schools Commission on Colleges in June 2017.

The university had its inaugural commencement ceremony on Jan 3, 2017. Fourteen students graduated with the Master of Science and four students were awarded the Bachelor of Science. The commencement speaker was JD Alexander, the former State Senator known for his advocacy of a STEM university in Lakeland. The campus was thus named after him.

Academics
The university offers nine baccalaureate programs, two master's programs and 31 areas of concentration. Curricula and classroom facilities are designed to facilitate hands-on, applied learning, and degree programs are focused on preparing students for STEM-related careers. Four Florida Poly bachelor's degrees received ABET accreditation on August 28, 2019: computer engineering, computer science, electrical engineering, and mechanical engineering.

Demographics

The inaugural class of students at Florida Poly had an average incoming GPA of 3.9 and test scores of 1350 on the SAT and 25 on the ACT. The average weighted high school GPA was 4.0, with average SAT and ACT scores for admitted freshman in fall 2017 at 1280 (SAT) and 28 (ACT).

Industry partnerships
Florida Poly collaborates with more than 100 corporate, government and non-government organizations that provide guidance on curriculum development, assist with research and offer internship opportunities. Industry partners include Microsoft, Lockheed Martin, Mosaic, Cisco and Harris Corporation. In Sept 2016, the University announced a long-term partnership with the Florida Department of Transportation (FDOT). The FDOT will build a 400-acre technology test facility, which will include a 2.25-mile test track.

Research
The Florida Industrial and Phosphate Research (FIPR) Institute is a Florida Poly research institution. The FIPR institute supports phosphate-related studies to improve the environment, protect public health and increase mining and processing efficiency. FIPR Institute's staff biologists, engineers and chemists also conduct in-house research, and the institute supports some non-phosphate topics such as energy and the mining and processing of other minerals.

Florida Poly's Advanced Mobility Institute (AMI) is a university-affiliated technology research center focused on the development and testing of autonomous vehicle (AV) related technology. AMI is not only unique to the state, but also one of the largest university centers specialized on the narrow area of testing and verification of AV technology in the country.

Campus

Florida Poly's 170-acre campus includes the Innovation, Science and Technology (IST) Building, two residence halls, Student Development Center, Wellness Center, and Admissions Center. The University Trail is a multiuse trail connected to the campus.

Innovation, Science, and Technology (IST) Building 

The 162,000-square-foot Innovation, Science, and Technology (IST) Building is the university's main facility. It houses 26 classrooms, faculty and administrative offices, 11,000-square-foot Saddle Creek Logistics Commons, seven labs–including a 3D printing lab, cybersecurity lab, and health informatics lab. The building is also home to the school's digital library. Designed by Spanish architect Santiago Calatrava, the building includes 94 robotic louvers on the roof that move to accommodate changing sunlight patterns.

Digital library
Florida Poly's IST Building includes a bookless library where students can access more than 135,000 digital titles on their choice of reader, tablet or laptop.  Students still have access to librarians and a reference desk to receive tutoring, resources and training to manage digital materials. Hard copy books can be requested on loan from libraries at Florida's 11 other public universities.

Applied Research Center
The Applied Research Center (ARC) is under construction with an anticipated opening in spring 2022. The new 85,000 square foot Applied Research Center (ARC) will house research and teaching laboratories, student design spaces, conference rooms, and faculty offices. The building will also provide study areas for graduate students and a small amount of administrative space. A dedicated section of the center will assist with commercialization of innovation and applied research and send new inventions into the marketplace.

Residence halls 
Florida Polytechnic University has two residence halls, starting with Residence Hall I, with Residence Hall II being built in 2015. Residence Hall I consists of three- and four-bedroom suites, while Residence Hall II is mostly two-bedroom "semi-suites". The buildings themselves were originally owned by an outside company, but as of November 2022 the school now owns both buildings.

FLPolyCon
Since April 2015, Florida Polytechnic University has hosted an annual convention called FLPolyCon. According to the website for the 2018 FLPolyCon, "FLPolyCon is a diverse, all-inclusive geek culture celebration hosted by the students at Florida Polytechnic University." Historically, the convention has catered to the self-professed "geek" culture by including aspects of video games and comics, often of the science fiction genre. More recently, FLPolyCon has been adding elements of anime and cosplay.

Notes

References

External links

 

State University System of Florida
Educational institutions established in 1988
Technological universities in the United States
Universities and colleges in Lakeland, Florida
Universities and colleges in Polk County, Florida
Educational institutions established in 2012
2012 establishments in Florida